The Figuig Province (Arabic: إقليم فكيك) is a province in the Oriental Region of Morocco. Its capital is Bouarfa. It recorded a population of 138,325 in the 2014 Moroccan census, up from 129,430 in 2004.

The major cities and towns are:
 Bni Tadjite
 Bouanane
 Bouarfa
 Figuig
 Talssint
 Tendrara

References

External links

 
Figuig